I Love You but I Must Drive Off This Cliff Now is the first studio album by American musical duo Got a Girl. It was released on Bulk Recordings on July 22, 2014. It peaked at number 27 on Billboards Heatseekers Albums chart.

Production 
The duo revealed that the album would feature heavy influences of French pop music, which were a shared interest between the two. According to Vents Magazine, Dan the Automator has "assembled a rich, enveloping sound world all its own, with hints of Laurel Canyon folk, yacht rock, and sunshine pop stylized and synthesized through sumptuous arrangements, intricate electronics, and unfettered melodic invention," whereas he has collaborated with Mary Elizabeth Winstead to write the lyrics.

In an interview with Complex, Winstead also details the inspiration behind the album—"French '60s pop—Jane Birkin, and stuff like that. It's kind of married with Dan's sensibility, which is his beats and a little bit of that low-key hip-hop vibe. So it makes for something that's very unique; it's very lounge-y and light. It's got a little bit of a French quality."

Release 
In May 2013, the official promo track "You and Me" was released. It was promoted as the first single from their upcoming album, but according to the track list that was released, it will not be included in the album.

On May 31, Got a Girl also recorded the song "I'm Down" from Beck's music sheet album Song Reader. The recording was released on YouTube. On July 8, 2014, the final track listing for the album was released, and Got a Girl's cover of the song was not selected to be included in the album.

Initially, Got a Girl's debut album was reported to be set for release in January 2014 via EMI, but was bumped to July 2014.

In June 2014, Spin revealed that the album, titled I Love You but I Must Drive Off this Cliff Now, will be released on July 22 via Bulk Recordings. The album's full track list is also revealed on AllMusic. The first single, "Did We Live Too Fast" premiered on June 3. The music video, directed by Hope Larson, premiered online on June 16.

The second single, "There's a Revolution" was released on July 8.

Critical reception 

At Metacritic, which assigns a weighted average score out of 100 to reviews from mainstream critics, the album received an average score of 66% based on 5 reviews, indicating "generally favorable reviews".

Track listing

Charts

References

External links 
 

2014 debut albums
Got a Girl albums
Albums produced by Dan the Automator